Bluesky is an initiative to develop a decentralized social network protocol. Organized by Twitter as a spin-out organization, it was announced in 2019, hired its first employees in 2021, and incorporated as a separate public benefit company the same year. Bluesky released its first early release, the Authenticated Data Experiment (ADX), to the public in mid-2022.

Description 

Bluesky is an initiative to develop a decentralized social network protocol, such that multiple social networks, each with its own systems of curation and moderation, can interact with other social networks through an open standard. Each social network using the protocol is an "application". The protocol is not using blockchain technology.

The Authenticated Data Experiment (ADX), in mid-2022, was Bluesky's first early protocol release. It uses personal data repositories, controlled by individual users, that social networks can optionally support. It is meant to let users share messages or engagement features across networks without affecting the user's home network moderation, as the data is stored in the personal data repository and networks can throttle which messages they permit. Bluesky released a simplified version as the AT Protocol in October 2022 with technical documentation.

Company history 

Twitter CEO Jack Dorsey first announced the Bluesky initiative in 2019 on Twitter. The company's Chief Technology Officer (and later CEO) Parag Agrawal was its manager, inviting initial working group members in early 2020. The group expanded with representatives from existing decentralized networks Mastodon and ActivityPub. The group coordinated through Element chat software. Twitter commissioned Jay Graber of the Happening decentralized social network to compose a technical review of the decentralized social network landscape. She was hired to lead Bluesky in August 2021. Bluesky formally incorporated in late 2021 as a public benefit LLC separate from Twitter with Graber as its chief executive officer and Dorsey on its board of directors.

Twitter executives approved of the initiative's scope and goals, which include what the protocol itself should encompass and what should be left to applications (the social networks built atop the standard). Some of these goals include letting applications customize their system of moderation, making applications responsible for compliance and takedown requests, and preventing virality algorithms from reinforcing controversy and moral outrage. The working group did not have a common consensus towards these goals, so Twitter decided to field individual proposals, which ranged from reinforcing existing standards to endorsing standard interoperability, letting usage data decide where to invest. In early 2021, Bluesky was in a research phase, with 40–50 people from the decentralized technology community active in assessing options and assembling proposals for the protocol. Bluesky's first three employees were hired in March 2022. Around the same time, Dorsey acknowledged Bluesky's slow progress.

Twitter's blockchain division, newly announced in November 2021, planned to work with the Bluesky initiative. The division head resigned during Elon Musk's Twitter takeover in late 2022. Staff departures made the team's future remit unclear. Musk's takeover did not immediately affect Bluesky's operations, as a separate entity, but affects its longterm funding. Bluesky had received $13 million from Twitter by Musk's initial offer in April 2022. Adi Robertson for The Verge wrote that even with Bluesky's independence, Musk's ownership of Twitter would make Bluesky an easy item to defund, with its main executive proponents having left Twitter.

AT protocol 
Bluesky unveiled open source code in May 2022 for an early version of their decentralized social network protocol, Authenticated Data Experiment (ADX), since named the AT Protocol. The team opened their early code and placed it under a MIT License so that their development process would be seen in public.

App 
Bluesky started a waitlist in October 2022 for an app that uses the protocol. At the time of release, Bluesky only addressed interoperability and had not explained how the protocol would address platform moderation and monetization. In February 2023, the Bluesky app was released for iOS as an invite-only beta. Reviewing the app, TechCrunch described it as "a functional, if still rather bare-bones, Twitter-like experience."

References

Further reading

External links 

 
 

Distributed computing projects
Social software
Twitter